Robert R. Bitmead is an Australian engineer, currently the Cymer Corporation Professor in High Performance Dynamical Systems at the University of California, San Diego Jacobs School of Engineering, and a published author. He is a member of the Institute of Electrical and Electronics Engineers.

References

21st-century American engineers
American non-fiction writers
University of California, San Diego faculty
Living people
Engineers from California
Year of birth missing (living people)